Chris Sadrinna (born 26 February 1975) is an Australian actor.

Biography 
He appeared in Home and Away as Brad Armstrong, during 2006 and 2007. Sadrinna played Lucy in the movie Garage Days, and also starred in Ivan Sen's debut feature film Beneath Clouds.  Both movies also featured Holly Brisley, his fellow cast member in Home and Away. Other television appearances include Blue Heelers, All Saints, Heartbreak High, and Water Rats.

In 2009 his work included appearing alongside former Home and Away co star Kate Ritchie playing a drug dealer named Greg Ollard in Underbelly: A Tale of Two Cities and starring in the thriller film Bad Bush.

Filmography
 1996 Blue Heelers (1 Episode) as Scott Osbourne
 1999 First Daughter as Eric Nelson
 1999 Monster! as Larry
 1999 Kick as Smithy
 1999 BeastMaster (2 Episodes) as Jem / Paj
 2000 Water Rats (1 Episode) as Derek Van Hargaan
 2000 All Saints (1 Episode) as David
 2002 Garage Days as Lucy
 2006-2007 Home and Away (198 Episodes) as Brad Armstrong
 2009 Underbelly (2 Episodes) as Greg Ollard
 2009 X-Men Origins: Wolverine as Van Mier
 2009 Bad Bush as Weaver

References

External links

1975 births
Australian male television actors
Living people
Male actors from Sydney